Rudolf Adolf Wilhelm Ross (Also styled Roß, 22 March 1872 – 16 February 1951) was a German teacher, politician of the  Social Democratic Party (SPD), member of the Hamburg Parliament and first Mayor of Hamburg.

Early life 
Ross was born on 22 March 1872 in Hamburg and became a teacher in 1892. He served in the First World War from 1914 until 1918. In 1923 he married his wife Frieda, née Hinsch (1899–1975).

Political career 
In 1919, Ross was elected as a member of the Hamburg Parliament, and served until 1933.  He was President of the diet from 1920 until 1928.  In 1928 the parliament elected Ross into the Senate of Hamburg and became Second Mayor, 1930 – 1931 he was First Mayor of Hamburg. On 3 March 1933 he resigned from the Hamburg Parliament under protest to the Machtergreifung—the Nazi takeover of power in Weimar Germany on 30 January 1933.

Death 
On 16 February 1951, Ross died after a long and severe illness in Hamburg.

Works

References

External links 
 
 

1872 births
1951 deaths
Mayors of Hamburg
Members of the Hamburg Parliament
Social Democratic Party of Germany politicians